Chinese foreign aid may be considered in this article as both governmental (official) and private development aid and humanitarian aid originating from the People’s Republic of China. 

Chinese official aid - unlike most major nation-state sources of aid - is not regulated and measured under the OECD's protocols for official development assistance (ODA). According to OECD estimates, 2020 official development assistance from China increased to US$4.8 billion. In this respect, the program is similar in monetary size to those of Norway and Canada. China, however, provides a larger amount of development finance in the form of less-concessional loans. The Chinese government represents its aid as characterised by a framework of South-South cooperation and "not interfering in the internal affairs of the recipient countries".

History
Following the establishment in 1949 of the People's Republic of China under the Chinese Communist Party (CCP), China began providing aid to other countries in support of socialist and anti-imperialist causes. An early instance was the donation of CHF 20 million to Egypt 1956 during the Suez Crisis. When China began its foreign aid program, it was the only poor country that was supplying outbound foreign aid, even providing assistance to countries that had a higher GDP per capita than China did. 

From 1956-1976, China provided $3.665 billion in foreign aid to the third world. China provided ten percent of these aid funds to Middle Eastern countries.

From 1970 and 1975, China helped finance and build the TAZARA Railway in East Africa, which cost about $500m, and as of 2012 was considered to be China's largest-ever single-item aid project. In 1974 (near the end of Mao Zedong's period as China's leader), aid reached the remarkably high proportion of 2% of gross national product. The proportion declined greatly thereafter although the absolute quantity of aid has risen with China's growing prosperity. Meanwhile, the motivation of aid became more pragmatic and less about promoting a grand ideology.

The China International Development Cooperation Agency (CIDCA) was created in 2018 to help streamline the process of China's foreign aid, in which the ministries of commerce and foreign affairs and the State Council are also involved.

Comparison with ODA 
Chinese aid, unlike the aid provided by most developed countries, is not governed by the categories of the OECD's Development Assistance Committee, and is not counted in international statistics as Official Development Assistance (ODA). Rather than being a "donor", China sees itself as working within a framework of South-South cooperation: 

The founding declaration of the Forum on China-Africa Cooperation (FOCAC) makes explicit China's critique of the dominant global mode of foreign aid, which in the Chinese view results in the mistreatment of developing countries:Each country has the right to choose, in its course of development, its own social system, development model and way of life in light of its national conditions. . . . Moreover, the politicization of human rights conditionalities on economic assistance should be vigorously opposed to as they constitute a violation of human rights.As Professor Dawn C. Murphy summarizes, “From China’s perspective, it is not merely offering an alternative model of foreign aid; it is directly critiquing the current system and the mistreatment of developing countries in that system.”The only political commitment China requires from aid recipients is that they accept the One China principle; China does not otherwise require  concessions on issues of governance.

China’s approach to financial aid has not changed over time, but the scope of its aid has grown as its own economic development needs have increased.

As of 2017, China does not provide comprehensive data on its foreign aid. The OECD has estimated that the quantity of China's ODA-like aid in 2018 was $4.4 billion. If counted as ODA, this would have placed China tenth in the list of donor states that year, between Norway and Canada, and far behind the United States which provided $34 billion. However, China provides a much higher volume of development financing that would not qualify as ODA because it lacks a sufficient concessional element and/or is linked to commercial transactions. A 2017 study for AidData found that China's ODA-like aid was effective at producing economic growth in recipient countries.

Administration and budget
The Department of Foreign Aid of the Ministry of Commerce (MOFCOM) is responsible for administrating the foreign aid program.   It does so in coordination with the Ministry of Foreign Affairs.  The portfolio of the Department of Foreign Aid includes grants, zero-interest loans, the youth volunteer program, and technical assistance.  The grants and interest free loans originate from the national budget.  The concessional loan program originates from the Export Import Bank of China but is managed under the direction of the Department of Foreign Aid.  In addition, the Department of Foreign Aid provides subsidies from the national budget covers the concessional component of loans.

Chinese foreign aid is thought to be unpopular domestically due to the common belief that the largesse is required more urgently at home. Due to the secrecy of China's aid programme details (of how much is given, to whom and for what) are difficult to ascertain.

A RAND published study on "China's Foreign Aid and Government Sponsored Investment" estimates the amount of both traditional aid and much more broadly defined government sponsored investment that was pledged by China in 2011 was 189.3 billion US dollars.

According to a 2017 study, described as “The most detailed study so far of Chinese aid,” by AidData, between 2000 and 2014 China gave about $75 billion, and lent about $275 billion — compared to $424 billion given by America during the same period. A fifth of this Chinese aid, $75 billion, was in the form of grants (about equivalent to Britain's), while the rest was concessional lending at below-market interest rates.

Forms of aid and recipients
Official sources divide aid into three categories: grants, interest free loans, and concessional loans. Deborah Brautigam identifies in her book The Dragon's Gift nine types of aid from China including "medical teams, training and scholarships, humanitarian aid, youth volunteers, debt relief, budget support, turn-key or ‘complete plant’ projects [infrastructure, factories], aid-in-kind and technical assistance."

Grants or non-interest loans have funded 2,025 complete infrastructure project, from the start of aid efforts up to 2009, in the categories of farming, water distribution, conference buildings, education facilities, power supply, transport, industrial facilities, and other projects.  Perhaps the famous type of project is a football stadium, which has been referred to as stadium diplomacy.  A similar type of project that receives attention is the construction of theatres and opera houses.

Africa 
There is an African focus with about 45% of aid going to African countries in 2009. A report by AidData, a research lab at the College of William & Mary, found that as of 2014 the majority of Chinese official development assistance went to Africa. The greatest recipients of Chinese aid in sub-Saharan Africa are, in descending order, Côte d’Ivoire, Ethiopia, Zimbabwe, Cameroon, Tanzania, Ghana, Mozambique, and Republic of Congo.

Asia 
In December 2005, China donated $20 million to the Asian Development Bank for a regional poverty alleviation fund; it was China's first such fund set up at an international institution.

China's financial assistance for infrastructure development has significantly increased supply capacity in south Asia, particularly among the smaller south Asian countries, beginning in the mid-2000s. Nepal benefitted from increased Chinese aid, including Chinese financing for a railway from Kathmandu to Lhasa. China has been an important foreign aid contributor to Sri Lanka since the end of the Sri Lankan Civil War in 2009. In Bangladesh, Chinese foreign aid has also become increasingly important. China has built six major "friendship bridges" in Bangladesh, among other projects. Because China has trade surpluses with these countries, its providing of foreign aid is viewed by the smaller south Asian countries as a means of insuring their respective bilateral relationships with China are mutually beneficial.

From the 1970s up to 2022 China has reportedly implemented more than 100 aid projects in Pacific Island countries.

In August 2022, the Ministry of Foreign Affairs of the People's Republic of China announced that it would forgive 23 interest-free loans that matured at the end of 2021 to 17 unspecified African countries.

China's role in the Armenian economy has been a major force for growth and development. Since the early 2000s, China has become Armenia's largest foreign donor, providing over $2 billion in foreign aid between 2000 and 2017. China's foreign aid to Armenia has been largely focused on infrastructure projects, such as roads, power plants and telecommunications networks, as well as assistance in areas of health and education. In 2020, Chinese President Xi Jinping announced a new $1 billion investment package for Armenia, which will be used to fund infrastructure and other economic projects. China's foreign aid to Armenia has been a catalyst for economic growth and development in the country. In the five years between 2000 and 2005, Armenia's GDP grew by an average of 6.8% annually, a rate that was more than double the average rate of 2.9% for the same period in the former Soviet Union. This growth was largely due to China's support for Armenian infrastructure projects, which helped to reduce transport costs, promote economic diversification, and improve the country's overall economic competitiveness. In addition to infrastructure projects, China has also provided assistance in other areas of the Armenian economy. In 2017, China provided over $15 million in grants and loans to Armenia to help finance the development of education and health systems. China has also provided technical assistance in the areas of agriculture, energy, and technology. By investing in these sectors, China has helped Armenia become a more self-sufficient and competitive economy. China's foreign aid has also helped to strengthen the Armenian government's stability and legitimacy. In 2020, Xi Jinping announced a $1 billion investment package for Armenia, which included a range of infrastructure and economic projects. This package was seen as a sign of China's commitment to Armenia's economic development, and was seen as a major boost for the Armenian government's legitimacy. Overall, China's foreign aid to Armenia has been a major force for economic growth and development in the country. Through its investments in infrastructure, health, education, and other sectors, China has helped Armenia to become a more self-sufficient and competitive economy.

See also
List of development aid agencies
List of development aid country donors
Foreign aid to China
Belt and Road Initiative
Foreign policy of China

References